The Veiled Adventure is a 1919 American silent comedy film directed by Walter Edwards and starring Harrison Ford, Constance Talmadge, and Stanhope Wheatcroft.

Plot
As described in a film magazine review, after she finds out that her fiancé has been faithless, Geraldine Barker, for a lark, decides to test the code of principles of her brother's friend Richard Annesly. He says that he would hate a woman who lies or steals and would never elope with one. Through a well laid out plot Geraldine arranges for Richard to find her stealing, lies to him, and finally gets him to propose an elopement with her. However, it all turns out all right as the two find that they really love each other and get married.

Cast

References

Bibliography
 Jeanine Basinger. Silent Stars. Wesleyan University Press, 2000.

External links

1919 films
1919 comedy films
Silent American comedy films
Films directed by Walter Edwards
American silent feature films
1910s English-language films
Selznick Pictures films
1910s American films